Antonia Bennett (born April 7, 1974) is an American singer of adult alternative music, standards, and jazz. She is the daughter of singer Tony Bennett and actress Sandra Grant.

Biography
Bennett trained as an actor at the Lee Strasberg Theatre and Film Institute in New York.  She then became an alumna of the Berklee College of Music in Boston.  Beginning in the mid-2000s, she began to appear as an opening act or guest at her father's shows. In 2013 she was married to Ronen Helmann, an Israeli; around the same time, she converted to Judaism.

In 2002, The New York Times Stephen Holden compared Bennett's voice to that of Billie Holiday, Rickie Lee Jones, and Betty Boop.  A JazzTimes profile from 2010 said that her voice does not resemble her father's and instead compared her to Jane Monheit and Nellie McKay.

Bennett's debut album Embrace Me, a treatment of standards from the Great American Songbook, was released on Perseverance Records in 2014.  It followed the release of EP in 2010 called Natural and a digital-only album in 2012.

Discography
 Natural (Mesa/Bluemoon, 2010)
 Embrace Me (Perseverance, 2014)

References

External links
 

Living people
American jazz singers
American women jazz singers
American people of Italian descent
Traditional pop music singers
1974 births
Berklee College of Music alumni
Converts to Judaism
21st-century American women singers
Place of birth missing (living people)
Jewish jazz musicians